is a Japanese film director and producer.

Filmography

Director

Film
 Tenamonya Sōsha (1998)
 Tsuribaka Nisshi Eleven (2000)
 Tsuribaka Nisshi 12: Shijō Saidai no Yukyū Kyūka (2001)
 Tsuribaka Nisshi 13: Hama-chan Kiki Ippatsu! (2002)
 Drugstore Girl (2004)
 GeGeGe no Kitaro (2007)
 GeGeGe no Kitaro 2: Sennen Noroi Uta (2008)
 Kamogawa Horumo (2009)
 Welcome Home, Hayabusa (2012)
 It All Began When I Met You (2013)
 Samurai Hustle (2014)
 Samurai Hustle Returns (2016)
 Recall (2018)
 Iwane: Sword of Serenity (2019)
 Angry Rice Wives (2021)
 Shylock's Children (2023)

TV drama
 Tange Sazen (2004)
 Maison Ikkoku (2007)

Producer
 Gonin (1995)
 Niji o Tsukamu Otoko (1996)

Actor
 What's a Film Director? (2006), as himself

References

External links

1963 births
Living people
Japanese film directors